"Man, It's So Loud in Here" is a song by They Might Be Giants, released in 2001.

Chart performance
The single peaked at number 86 on the Australian ARIA singles chart in November 2001.

Track listing
US single
"Man, It's So Loud in Here" (radio edit) – 3:51
"Man, It's So Loud in Here" – 3:59
"Man, It's So Loud in Here" (Hot 2002 Remix) – 3:42

Australian single
"Man, It's So Loud in Here" (radio edit) – 3:51
"Your Mom's Alright" (featuring Mike Doughty) – 2:59
"Rest Awhile" – 1:40
"On the Drag" – 2:18
"Man, It's So Loud in Here" (Hot 2002 Remix) – 3:42

European single
"Man, It's So Loud in Here" (radio edit) – 3:51
"Man, It's So Loud in Here" – 3:59
"Birdhouse in Your Soul" (Live from New York) – 3:12

Charts

References

External links
Man, It's So Loud in Here EP on This Might Be A Wiki
"Man, It's So Loud in Here" (song) on This Might Be A Wiki

2001 songs
Shock Records singles
They Might Be Giants songs